Hans Petersson (24 September 1902 in Bentschen – 9 November 1984 in Münster) was a German mathematician. He introduced the Petersson inner product and is also known for the Ramanujan–Petersson conjecture.

See also

Weil–Petersson metric

References

1902 births
1984 deaths
People from Zbąszyń
20th-century German mathematicians
People from the Province of Posen
Academic staff of Charles University
Nazi Party members
Academic staff of the University of Münster